Wildlife includes all non-domesticated plants, animals, and other organisms.

Wildlife or Wild Life may also refer to:

Film and television 
 Boonie Bears: The Wild Life, a 2021 Chinese animated film
 Robinson Crusoe (2016 film), a Belgian-French animated film released in North America as The Wild Life
 The Wild Life (film), a 1984 American film
 Wildlife (film), a 2018 American drama film by Paul Dano
 Wild Life (1918 film), a silent American film directed by Henry Otto
 Wild Life (2011 film), an animated short Wendy Tilby and Amanda Forbis
 Wild Life (2014 film), a French-Belgian drama film
 Wild Life (2023 film), a documentary film by Elizabeth Chai Vasarhelyi and Jimmy Chin
 Wild Life (concert), a 2010 concert tour by Hikaru Utada
 Wild Life (TV series), a 2020 adult animated comedy series on Syfy's late-night programming block, TZGZ.
 "Wildlife" (Law & Order: Special Victims Unit), a 10th-season episode of Law & Order: Special Victims Unit

Magazines 
 BBC Wildlife
 Wild Life (magazine), Australian natural history magazine published 1938–1954

Music 
 Wildlife (band), Toronto indie rock band
 Wild Life (Wings album), 1971
 Wild Life (Pupil album)
 Wildlife (Mott the Hoople album), 1971
 Wildlife (Anthony Phillips and Joji Hirota album)
 Wildlife (Girlschool EP), 1982
 The Wild Life (album), a 1992 album by the American band Slaughter
 Wildlife (The Crash album), 2001
 Wildlife (Headlights album), 2009
 Wildlife (Joe Morris album), 2009
 Wildlife (La Dispute album), 2011
 Wild Life (Hedley album), 2013
 "The Wild Life" (song), by Bananarama
 "Wild Life" (Jack & Jack song), 2014
 "Wild Life", a song by Captain Beefheart from Trout Mask Replica
 "The Wild Life", a song by Vacationer (band) on their album Relief.
 D.I.T.C. Presents Wild Life, a 2001 EP by Diggin' in the Crates Crew

Other 
 Wild Life (comic anthology), a furry anthology comic book published by Antarctic Press
 Wild Life (manga), a 2003 manga, created by Masato Fujisaki, about a delinquent who is working as a veterinarian
Wildlife (novel), a novel by Richard Ford and the basis for the 2018 film of the same name